China Alley may be:
China Alley (Bakersfield)
China Alley (Billings)
China Alley (Hanford)
China Alley (Ventura)

See also
Chinatown